Jai Vardhan Yadav alias Bachcha Yadav is an Indian politician. He was elected to the Bihar Legislative Assembly from Paliganj assembly. Yadav started his political career in 2005 from Raghopur assembly as a member of Indian National Congress party but lost. In 2015 he was elected Member of Bihar Legislative Assembly as a member of the Rashtriya Janata Dal. He is a grandson of Ram Lakhan Singh Yadav. He left the Rashtriya Janata Dal on 20 August 2020 and same day joined Janata Dal (United) in the presence of cabinet minister Bijendra Prasad Yadav.

References

People from Patna
Bihar MLAs 2015–2020
1978 births
Living people
Rashtriya Janata Dal politicians
Janata Dal (United) politicians
Indian National Congress politicians from Bihar